Heidi MacDonald (born November 15) is a writer and editor in the field of comic books based in New York City. She runs the comics industry news blog The Beat.

Career
MacDonald is a former editor for DC Comics' Vertigo imprint and Disney Adventures, and also edited the graphic novel The Hills Have Eyes: The Beginning from Fox Atomic Comics that is a prequel to the 2006 film.

She created her long-running blog The Beat: The News Blog of Comics Culture (also known as Comics Beat) at Comicon.com in June 2004, before moving it to Publishers Weekly in 2006, and to an independent site in 2010. In 2016, she announced she was moving The Beat to the webcomics site Hiveworks. She wrote, "The era of the 'bedroom blogger' is long gone, replaced by corporate entities trying to outdo each other with clickbait headlines and subsisting on popup ads that get more bewildering every day."

MacDonald also was an editor and writer at Publishers Weekly. In January 2016, MacDonald announced she was laid off from her position at Publishers Weekly, although she would continue to write for the magazine on a freelance basis.In 2017, comics publisher Lion Forge acquired The Beat''. In January 2020, it was announced that after Lion Forge was acquired by Polarity, the company cut ties with MacDonald. In a press release, MacDonald indicated she would continue the blog independently.

References

Citations

Sources

External links

Year of birth missing (living people)
Living people
American women journalists
Comic book editors
Comics critics
Place of birth missing (living people)
21st-century American women